Campatonema is a genus of moths in the family Geometridae described by E. Dukinfield Jones in 1921.

Species
Campatonema lineata (Schaus, 1911)
Campatonema marginata E. D. Jones, 1921
Campatonema tapantia Sullivan, 2010
Campatonema yanayacua Sullivan, 2010

References

Bolling, Sullivan. (March 2010)."New species of the Neotropical genus Campatonema Jones (Geometridae, Ennominae) with the first description of the female". ZooKeys. 39 

Ourapterygini